The men's 100 metres event at the 2015 Military World Games was held on 4 and 5 and 6 October at the KAFAC Sports Complex.

Records
Prior to this competition, the existing world and CISM record were as follows:

Schedule

Medalists

Results

Round 1
Qualification: First 3 in each heat (Q) and next 6 fastest (q) qualified for the semifinals.

Wind:Heat 1: +3.5 m/s, Heat 2: +2.8 m/s, Heat 3: +1.8 m/s, Heat 4: +1.3 m/s, Heat 5: +3.1 m/s, Heat 6: +2.2 m/s

Semifinals
Qualification: First 2 in each heat (Q) and next 2 fastest (q) qualified for the final.

Wind:Heat 1: -2.2 m/s, Heat 2: -0.7 m/s, Heat 3: -1.4 m/s

Final
Wind: +1.7 m/s

References

100
2015